Callanan is an Irish surname. Notable people with the surname include:

 Aonghus Callanan (born 1985), Irish sportsman
 Colm Callanan (born 1982), Irish sportsperson
 Fionnbar Callanan, Irish sports photographer
 Ian Callanan (born 1971), Irish composer
 James J. Callanan (1842–1900), businessman and politician
 James Joseph Callanan (1795–1829), Irish poet
 Jeremiah Joseph Callanan (1795–1829), Irish poet
 Joe Callanan (born 1949), Irish politician
 John Joe Callanan (1894–1970), Irish sportsperson
 Johnny Callanan (1910–1982), Irish politician
 Liam Callanan, American author and professor of English
 Martin Callanan (born 1961), British politician
 Martin John Callanan (born 1982), artist
 Michael Callanan (1849–1929), politician
 Peter Callanan (1935–2009), Irish politician
 Séamus Callanan (born 1988), hurler

See also
 Callinan

Irish medical families